Khardung La or Khardung Pass is a mountain pass in the Leh district of the Indian union territory of Ladakh.

The pass is on the Ladakh Range, north of Leh, and connects the Indus river valley and the Shyok river valley. It also forms the gateway to the  Nubra valley, beyond which lies the Siachen Glacier. A motorable road through the pass was built in 1976, and opened to public motor vehicles in 1988. Maintained by the Border Roads Organisation, the pass is strategically important to India as it is used to carry supplies to the Siachen Glacier. The road is one of the world's highest motoroable roads.

History
Khardong La is historically important as it lies on the major caravan route from Leh to Kashgar in Central Asia. About 10,000 horses and camels used to take the route annually, and a small population of Bactrian camels can still be seen at Hunder, in the area north of the pass. In the early 1950s, William O. Douglas described "the trail, after crossing the Indus, divides, one fork going south along the river's edge to Spitok, Khalatse and Khargil, the other turning north to Leh, the Khardong Pass (...), and Yarkand, an ancient trading center of Sinkiang." He continues, "Leh is on a historic caravan route that leads not only to Yarkand in Sinkiang but to Lhasa in Tibet. (...) the stream of trade. Wool, silver, felts, tea, candy, skins, velvets, silk, gold, carpets, musk, coral, borax, jade cups, salt came down from the north. Cotton goods, shawls, brocades, opium, indigo, plumes, shoes, pearls, ginger, cloves, pepper, honey, tobacco, sugar cane, barley rice, wheat, corn came up from the south." During World War II there was an attempt to transfer war material to China through this route..

Location

Khardung La is 39 km by road from Leh. Earlier, the first 24 km, as far as the South Pullu check point, were paved. From there to the North Pullu checkpoint about 15 km beyond the pass the roadway was primarily loose rock, dirt, and occasional rivulets of snow melt. Now, all the way is properly paved. The road approaching the Nubra Valley is very well maintained (except in a few places where washouts or falling rock occur). Hired vehicles (two and four-wheel-drive), heavy trucks, and motorcycles regularly travel into the Nubra Valley, though special permits are required to be arranged for travellers.

The  elevation measure from hundreds of GPS surveys matches SRTM data, ASTER GDEM data, and Russian topographic mapping. It is broadly consistent with numerous GPS reports.

The nearest sizable town is Leh. Leh is connected by road from Manali and Srinagar, and daily flights are operated from Delhi. From Leh, a daily bus service to Nubra Valley passes over Khardung La which may also be reached by a hired car with an experienced driver or by motorcycle. The two bases on either side of Khardung La are North Pullu and South Pullu.

An Inner Line Permit (ILP), which can be acquired at the District Commissioner's office in Leh, is required for tourists (not needed for Ladakh citizens). People are required to check in en route and must provide photocopies of the permits to be deposited at each checkpoint.

Altitude sickness is a serious health concern for people not acclimatised to high altitudes. Prophylactic altitude-sickness medication such as acetazolamide may be necessary for some as there are no emergency medical facilities to treat altitude sickness along the route.

The road is closed from approximately October to May due to snow and is often subject to long delays due to traffic congestion on narrow one-lane sections, washouts, landslides and road accidents.

Climate
Khardung La has an arctic tundra climate (ET) with short, cool summers and long, very cold winters.

Gallery

See also
Silk Road
Extreme points of Earth
Umling La

References

Mountain passes of Ladakh
Mountain passes of the Himalayas
Tourism in Ladakh